Tesfaye Gebreab (ተስፋዬ ገብረኣብ, 28 August 1968 – 24 December 2021) was an Ethiopian-born Eritrean writer and literary publisher. He was best known as a well-renowned Eritrean journalist and editor in the Ethiopian printed press. In Eritrea, however, amongst his fellow Eritrean citizens, he was mainly known for his books and his attachment to the Oromo ethnic group.

His book, "Ye burka zimita" was a book that narrated history of Oromo resistance history and future hopes. Because of his contributions to Oromo literature, he was given an honorary name 'Gadaa'.

Gebreab worked as a journalist before becoming a full time writer. He penned eight books, including historical novels, true stories, short stories, and memoirs. One of his later books, 'Ye Nurebi Mahder', 'Nurenebi File', a hundred year long story of Eritrea and Ethiopia, received wide scale recognition locally and regionally. Gebreab wrote in Amharic.

Personal life and death
Gebreab was born on 28 August 1968 in Ethiopia, in the town of Bishoftu. His parents were Eritreans who in the 1950s, migrated from Mendefera, Eritrea, to Ethiopia.

He died in Nairobi, Kenya on 24 December 2021, at the age of 53.

References

1968 births
2021 deaths
Eritrean journalists
Eritrean male writers
Eritrean people of Ethiopian descent
People from Oromia Region